Daniel James Miller (born 12 June 1983) is an English cricketer.  Miller is a left-handed batsman who bowls right-arm medium-fast.  He was born in Hammersmith, London and educated at Ewell Castle School and Kingston College.

Miller made a single appearances for Surrey in 2002, in a List A match against Northamptonshire in the Norwich Union League.  Later, while studying for his degree at Loughborough University, Miller made his first-class debut for Loughborough UCCE against Essex in 2006.  He made a further first-class appearance for the team in 2006, against Hampshire.  In his two first-class matches, he failed to score any runs, while with the ball he took 2 wickets at an average of 75.00, with best figures of 1/11.

References

External links
Daniel Miller at ESPNcricinfo
Daniel Miller at CricketArchive

1983 births
Living people
People from Hammersmith
Cricketers from Greater London
People educated at Ewell Castle School
English cricketers
Surrey cricketers
Alumni of Loughborough University
Loughborough MCCU cricketers
Alumni of Kingston College (England)